DeLancey Floyd-Jones (January 20, 1826 – January 19, 1902) was a career officer in the United States Army, serving in the Mexican–American War and the American Civil War, as well as on frontier duty in the Old West.

Early career
DeLancey Floyd-Jones was born in South Oyster Bay, New York. He graduated from the United States Military Academy at West Point, 45th in the Class of 1846. With the outbreak of the Mexican–American War, he was assigned to Company D, 7th U.S. Infantry as second lieutenant. In November 1846, he was transferred to Company E, 4th U.S. Infantry. He participated in several major battles, including the Siege of Veracruz, the Battle of Molino del Rey, and the Battle for Mexico City. For gallant and meritorious conduct at Molino del Rey, he was brevetted to first lieutenant on September 8, 1847, receiving a promotion to the full rank in January 1848, when he was briefly assigned to duty in Pascagoula, Mississippi.

Floyd-Jones was reassigned to a garrison in Detroit, Michigan, from 1848–50. He then performed recruiting duty for two more years before being assigned to Benicia, California. During the Yakima War, he served at Fort Vancouver and at Fort Steilacoom in the Washington Territory until 1855. Floyd-Jones was promoted to captain on July 31, 1854, while in Washington. He returned to California for a year before being assigned to duty in Oregon.

American Civil War
With the outbreak of the Civil War, Floyd-Jones was promoted to major of the 11th U.S. Infantry on May 14, 1861, and sent to the Eastern Theater. During the 1862 Peninsula Campaign in Virginia, Floyd-Jones commanded the 11th Infantry at the battles of Yorktown, Gaines Mill and Malvern Hill. He was appointed a brevet lieutenant colonel on July 4, 1862, for "gallant and meritorious service during the Peninsular Campaign." He served in the Northern Virginia Campaign, August to September 1862, including the Second Battle of Bull Run. During the Maryland Campaign, his regiment was lightly engaged at the Battle of Antietam, where they took a position immediately east of Sharpsburg.

Floyd-Jones was active in the Rappahannock Campaign and the Mud March, then went into winter camp prior to seeing action again at the Battle of Chancellorsville. At the Battle of Gettysburg, Floyd-Jones led his men into action near the Wheatfield, suffering substantial casualties. He was appointed a brevet colonel, July 2, 1863, for "gallant and meritorious service at Gettysburg."

On August 1, 1863, he was promoted to lieutenant colonel of the 19th U.S. Infantry and was assigned to supervise recruitment at Fort Independence in Massachusetts. In October of that year, he assumed command of the defenses and fortifications of Boston Harbor, a post he held until March 1865. He was brevetted brigadier general on March 13, 1865, and became commander of the 19th Infantry in April 1865.

Post-war career
After the war, Floyd-Jones served in a variety of administrative posts, commanding Newport Barracks in Kentucky from October 1865 to March 1866, and the occupation garrison of Little Rock, Arkansas, from March to August 1866. Following sick leave, he was assigned as Acting Assistant Inspector General and Judge Advocate of the Department of Arkansas from December 1866 to February 1867. He was then in command of Fort Smith, Arkansas until October 1867, and then of Fort Gibson and the District of Indian Territory until January 1868. On June 25, 1867, he was promoted to colonel and assigned to the 6th U.S. Infantry. He served as Superintendent of Indian Affairs in Idaho Territory from June 1869 to November 1870, then at various times commanded Fort Dodge, Fort Hays, the post at Holly Springs, Mississippi, Jackson Barracks in New Orleans, Louisiana, and the garrison in Helena, Montana. In 1871, he was assigned to the 3rd U.S. Infantry. He retired March 20, 1879.

Personal life
DeLancey Floyd-Jones was the fifth child of State Senator Henry Floyd-Jones (1792–1862) and Helen M. (Watts) Floyd-Jones. He was married twice: First, on June 24, 1852, to Laura Jane "Jennie" Whitney (1827-1852), of Rochester, New York, who died only three months after their wedding while Floyd-Jones was stationed in Washington Territory; Second, on April 29, 1878, to Minnie Oglesby (1858-1929), of New Orleans. They separated a few years after their wedding but never divorced.

Floyd-Jones traveled around the world many times, during leaves from the army and after his retirement in 1879. He documented these journeys in letters home, and frequently had his observations and descriptions of these faraway places published in local Long Island, New York newspapers such as The South Side Signal and The Hempstead Inquirer. He also published a well-reviewed book about his travels to India, China, and Japan in the late 1880s, entitled Letters From The Far East.

He was also the founder and builder, in 1896, of the first free library on the south shore of Long Island, the Delancey Floyd-Jones Free Library, contributing his personal books.

After retirement, he became more involved in the many social and military organizations he had joined over the years. In 1847, he was among the establishers of The Aztec Club of 1847. In 1885, he was elected treasurer of the club; in 1892 he presented the club with a silver centerpiece manufactured by Tiffany's representing an ancient Aztec Teocali. The centerpiece is still used at their annual meetings to this day. In 1894 he was elected vice president of the club, and succeeded to the presidency the following year, while also remaining treasurer. He was also an active member of the South Side Sportsman's Club, The St. Nicholas Society, the Loyal Legion of the United States, and was a lifetime member of the Sons of the Revolution.

A note on the hyphenation of his last name:  DeLancey Floyd-Jones is descended from Major Thomas Jones (1665–1713) privateer and soldier, for whom Jones Beach, Long Island, is named; and Col. Richard Floyd (1620-c. 1690). In 1757, Thomas Jones's granddaughter, Arabella Jones, married Col. Richard Floyd IV, son of Richard Floyd III, whose will stated that his (sizeable) estate would be handed down to the first male issue of any issue with provision that the name be hyphenated to contain "Floyd." Arabella fulfilled that provision, and thus, the name was hyphenated Floyd-Jones.

DeLancey Floyd-Jones was also related (through direct line or marriage) to William Floyd and Philip Livingston, both signers of the Declaration of Independence; writer James Fenimore Cooper; John Loudon McAdam (creator of the road construction style named after him); Daniel Webster, Governor DeWitt Clinton of New York, Edith Wharton, and Alexander Hamilton.

See also

References
 Heitman, Francis, Historical Register and Dictionary of the United States Army 1789–1903, Washington, US Government Printing Office, 1903.
 The Jones Family of Long Island: descendants of Major Thomas Jones (1665-1726) and allied families, John H. Jones; New York, T.A. Wright, 1907, NYPL Call No. APV (Jones.)
 The Floyd Jones Family, and his descendants The Floyd-Jones Family with connections from the year 1066, Thomas Floyd-Jones II, 1906, Fort Neck, Queens County, Long Island 1695.
 Memorial of the late Honorable David S. Jones, With an Appendix, containing notices of the Jones Family, of Queen's County, William Alfred Floyd; New York, Stanford and Swords, 1849, NYPL Call No. APV (Jones.
 Civil War High Commands, Eicher & Eicher.
 List of Officers of the Army of the United States 1779–1900, Colonel William H. Powell, 1900.
 Supplement to the Official Records of the Union and Confederate Armies, edited by Janet B. Hewett, et al., Wilmington, NC, Broadfoot Pub. Co., 1994-.
 Biographical Register of the officers and graduates of the U.S. Military Academy at West Point, N.Y. from its establishment in 1802 to 1890, by George W. Cullum, Houghton-Mifflin & Co., Boston & NY 1891 [Third edition, 1950, The Riverside Press, Cambridge] Vol. 2
 The War of the Rebellion: a compilation of the Official Records of the Union and Confederate Armies, prepared under the direction of the Secretary of War, Robert N. Scott. Orig. published Washington, Government Print Office 1880–1901.
 Compendium of the War of the Rebellion, Dyer, Frederick H., Morningside Press, Dayton Ohio, 1994, (Vol. ? pages 1712–1713).
 Social Register of New York, years 1880 to 1902.
 Aztec Club of 1847: Sesquicentennial History by Richard H. Breithaupt Jr. Walika Publishing Company 1998.
 Fort Smith, little Gibraltar on the Arkansas by Edward Bearss and Arell M. Gibson, 1988 University of Oklahoma Press.
 Under the Old Flag:Recollections of military operations in the War for the union, Spanish War, the Boxer Rebellion, etc., by James Harrison Wilson, 1912 Appleton and Company.
 The papers of Ulysses S. Grant, edited by John Y. Simon, 1967 Southern Illinois University Press.
 Brevet Brigadier Generals in Blue by Roger D. Hunt & Jack R. Brown, 1990 Olde Soldier Books.
 Journal of Army Life by Rodney Glisan, A. L. Bancroft 1874.
 Sykes' Regular Infantry Division, 1861-1864: A History of regular United States infantry operations in the Civil War's Eastern theater by Timothy J. Reese 1990, McFarland.
 Soldier in the West, Letters of Theodore Talbot During His Services in California, Mexico, and Oregon, 1845–5, edited by Robert V. Hine and Savoie Lottinville 1972, University of Oklahoma Press.
 The Diary of a Dead Man 1862-1864 Letters and Diary of Private Ira S. Pettit, Compiled by J. P. Ray 1969, Acorn Press.
 Army Letters from an Officer's Wife 1871-1888 by Frances M. A. Roe 1981, University of Nebraska Press.
 The Colonel's Lady on the Western Frontier: The Correspondence of Alice Kirk Grierson, edited by Shirley Anne Leckie 1989, University of Nebraska Press.
 Cavalry Wife: The Diary of Eveline M. Alexander, 1866–1867, edited by Sandra L. Myres 1977, Texas A & M University Press.
 University of Berkeley, California, T. W. Norris Collection, Bancroft Library.
 Queensborough Library, Long Island Division, DeLancey Floyd-Jones Scrapbooks from The Floyd-Jones Family Papers.
 The New York Historical Society, Henry O. Floyd-Jones, Business Papers and Letters of Charles Watts, Floyd-Jones Family papers [ca. 1807-c. 1900].
 Hofstra University, Long Island Division, Papers of DeLancey Floyd-Jones.

External links
Guide to the Floyd-Jones Family Correspondence at The Bancroft Library

 http://digital.library.okstate/edu/Chronicles/v002/v002p009.html Military Reminiscences of Captain Richard T. Jacob, Oklahoma Society Chronicles of Oklahoma, Volume 2, No. 1 March 1924, Pages 9–36
 The Seventh Regiment of Infantry  By Lieutenant A. B. Johnson, 7TH U. S. INFANTRY; The Fourth Regiment of Infantry By Lieut. James A. Leyden, ADJUTANT 4TH U. S. INFANTRY; The Eleventh Regiment of Infantry By Capt. J. H. Patterson, U. S. A., TWENTIETH INFANTRY; The Nineteenth Regiment of Infantry By Lieut. C. C. Hewitt, 19TH U. S. INFANTRY.; The Sixth Regiment of Infantry By Lieutenant Charles Byrne, ADJ. 6TH U. S. INFANTRY; The Third Regiment of Infantry By Lieutenant J.H. McRae, 3RD U. S. INFANTRY
 Excerpts from The Nineteenth Regiment of Infantry by First Lieut. Charles H. Cabaniss Jr., 18th U. S. Infantry, abstracted from T.F. Rodenbough's 1896 History of the Army of the United States	
 The Oregon Recruit Expedition By Albert Watkins, Collections of the Nebraska State Historical Society
 Case Studies in Historical Archaeology: Fort Yamhill, Oregon by William Hampton Adams
 Snoqualmie Valley People
 National Park Service Site History Online – Redwood National Park, Oregon
 Commanding Officers at Fort Gibson, Oklahoma
 Twain Quotes
 http://myindianahome.net/gen/jeff/records/cemetary/sprgdaln.html Springdale Cemetery, Jefferson County, Madison, Indiana
 http://www.lib.uidaho.edu/mcbeth/governmentdoc/superintendency/1869.htm Indian Affairs
 Indian Affairs
 Yakima, Washington Territory
 https://web.archive.org/web/20050427210431/http://longislandgenealogy.com/norton/addnorton.html
 William Weeks
 Curry Coastal Pilot (Oregon Publication)
 The Aztec Club
 
 

1826 births
1902 deaths
American military personnel of the Mexican–American War
Members of the Aztec Club of 1847
People of New York (state) in the American Civil War
Union Army officers
United States Army generals